Alma de Bretteville Spreckels (March 24, 1881 – August 7, 1968) was a wealthy socialite and philanthropist in San Francisco, California. Among her many accomplishments, she persuaded her first husband, sugar magnate Adolph B. Spreckels, to donate the California Palace of the Legion of Honor to the city of San Francisco.

Early life
She was born Alma Charlotte Corday le Normand de Bretteville in the Sunset District of San Francisco, the fifth of six children of Viggo and Mathilde de Bretteville, two Danish immigrants. The family was very poor during her early childhood. Viggo descended from Franco-Danish nobility through his grandfather who emigrated during the French Revolution (one of Napoleon III's generals was his uncle) and used that as an excuse to avoid working while simultaneously deriding the "nouveau riche" of California. In contrast, Mathilde had enough ingenuity and business sense to open a combination Danish bakery–laundry service–massage parlor which became the family's source of income. At age 14, Alma quit school to work full-time for the family business. Meanwhile, she had developed a love of art and enrolled in the Mark Hopkins Institute of Art to study painting. While there, she earned money by being a nude model. Now flush with cash, she became popular around town, and found herself intimately involved with a miner named Charlie Anderson. After their relationship deteriorated, she gained a bit of notoriety for having successfully sued him for "personal defloweration".

Alma de Bretteville met her future husband thanks to the rumor she modeled for the Dewey Monument by Robert Aitken, which can be found in Union Square. Legend holds that Aitken hired Alma de Bretteville Spreckels to model for the statue, but a 1902 article detailing the monument's construction stated that Aitken's model was Clara Petzold, who later became a noted photographer. Regardless, this statue was selected from a number of entries and only barely made the cut, thanks to the crucial vote of the chair of the Citizens' Committee, Adolph Spreckels. Although he was 24 years older than she was, he was smitten by Alma, and after a five-year courtship, they married on May 11, 1908. Because he was head of the Spreckels Sugar Company, she often referred to her husband as her "sugar daddy".

Initially, they lived in Adolph's house in Sausalito, where their first daughter, Alma Emma, was born in 1909, but he soon purchased a property in Pacific Heights where, after the existing homes on it were relocated, Adolph built a new mansion, the Spreckels Mansion in the Beaux-Arts style, completed in c.1912 (it is most recently the home of author Danielle Steel). In the meantime, son Adolph Bernard Jr. was born in 1911, followed by another daughter, Dorothy Constance, in 1913. It was after Dorothy's birth that Spreckels learned her husband had contracted syphilis before their marriage, as he began showing symptoms of the disease. Fortunately for her, she never caught it from him.

Palace of the Legion of Honor

After the mansion was completed, Spreckels began throwing opulent parties befitting a woman of her status. Although attended by local celebrities such as author Jack London and sculptor Earl Cummings, there were a number of people who were disdainful of her earlier infamy and snubbed her invitations. This motivated her to gain some respectability for herself, which she did by going to Paris. There, she met entertainer Loie Fuller and through Fuller, other artists, most notably Auguste Rodin. With Fuller's encouragement and contacts, Alma Spreckels eventually became one of the more influential art collectors in the U.S.

She returned from Paris right after the beginning of World War I. Having purchased a number of Rodin's works directly from the artist, she had them displayed at the 1915 Panama–Pacific International Exposition. It was there that Spreckels fell in love with the French Pavilion, which was a temporary building constructed only of a wood frame covered with staff, a kind of faux stone made from a mixture of plaster and burlap-type fiber. She decided to have a permanent and exact replica of the building constructed so she could permanently contain her burgeoning art collection, but it would be another nine years before this dream could come to fruition.

In the intervening time, she busied herself with charity auctions, raising money for war-torn France, Belgium, and Romania. For one such event at the Palace Hotel, she was able to obtain donations from U.S. presidents and other renowned individuals. Her own collection was not spared: her prized Rodin The Genius of War also went on the auction block.

After some persuading, Adolph eventually agreed to fund Spreckels' museum project. To acquire more art and financial support, Spreckels returned to Europe. The French government agreed to supply some, and Queen Marie of Romania donated a replica of her Byzantine Golden Room. While Spreckels was in Europe, President Warren G. Harding requested her help in compiling a report on post-war working conditions for women for the Department of Labor's Women's Bureau, which she dutifully carried out.

In 1921, ground was broken for the Palace of the Legion of Honor Museum in Lincoln Park, San Francisco. As Spreckels envisioned it, the building is an almost exact, full-scale replica of the French Pavilion from the 1915 Panama Pacific International Exposition, which in turn was a three-quarter-scale version of the Palais de la Légion d'Honneur in Paris designed by George Applegarth and H. Guillaume. At the close of the exposition, which was located just a few miles away in the current Marina district, the French government granted Adolph permission to construct a permanent replica of the French Pavilion. The museum opened on November 11, 1924, six months after Adolph's death. During the dedication ceremony, the Counsellor of State of France announced that Spreckels had been awarded the Grand Cross of the Légion d'honneur.

Remarriage
Spreckels continued her charity rummage sales during the Great Depression, this time expanded to thrift shops, which were eventually given to The Salvation Army to operate. She also continued her devotion to the arts, obtaining more and more works for her museum as well as coordinating and partially funding the development of the Maryhill Museum of Art in Maryhill, Washington, after the death of her friend Samuel Hill.

Spreckels met Elmer Awl, a Santa Barbara rancher and businessman, during her inquiries into the Samarkand Hotel, a Persian-themed hotel which had fallen into disrepair. She purchased the property for $55,000 in 1937 and proceeded to renovate it, hoping to provide another home for her now-overflowing art collection. Spreckels and Awl hit it off immediately and were married in 1939. Awl moved to San Francisco, but the hotel was not particularly successful and Spreckels sent him back to Santa Barbara to manage the business, but he was also unable to stem the losses. They decided to rid themselves of it, but could not find a buyer. Eventually, the hotel was swapped for a dairy farm in Marin County worth $80,000.

When the U.S. was drawn into World War II, Awl, as a member of the United States Coast Guard Reserve, was called to active duty. While he was away, Spreckels formed a new charity, the San Francisco League for Servicemen, which gathered supplies for the Army and Navy. She even donated her vast Sonoma County ranch to the Army to use as a recreational facility. Near the end of the war, Spreckels discovered that Awl had been having an affair with her niece Ulla, and she quickly divorced him in 1943, while he was still stationed in Central America.

Later life
Spreckels' last major project was the construction of the San Francisco Maritime Museum. When it opened in 1951, her collection of model ships that had been on display at the 1939–40 Golden Gate International Exposition was the main exhibit. However, she had had a feud with museum founding director Karl Kortum and as a result, did not receive much recognition for her role in that museum's establishment.

After her son Adolph's death in 1961, she lived mostly in seclusion, visiting only with her daughters and grandchildren. She died in 1968 of pneumonia at age 87.

Further reading

References

External links
 Genealogy  on Pierfit geneanet
Alma de Bretteville Spreckels at Find a Grave

American art collectors
American socialites
People from San Francisco
Philanthropists from California
1881 births
1968 deaths
Deaths from pneumonia in California
Grand Croix of the Légion d'honneur
American people of Danish descent